The university is situated in Lashio Thein Ni road, Lashio Township, Northern Shan State. The university is run by Ministry of Science and technology, Myanmar. It was established in 1997 as Government Technical Institute snf finally it was upgraded to University level in 2007 and it is known as Technological University, Lashio. The school has 55.36 acres wide. Yearly average graduation students are about 30 students and lower than Taunggyi.

Programs
The University offers Diploma, Bachelor and Master.

See also
 Technological University, Taunggyi
 Technological University, Loikaw
 Technological University, Panglong
 Technological University, Kyaingtong
 List of Technological Universities in Myanmar

Universities and colleges in Shan State